Emperor towers or Kaiser towers ( or Kaiserwarten) are monuments that were built up to 1918 in honour of the German emperors William I, Frederick III and Wilhelm II in the German Empire or for Emperor Franz Josef in Austria-Hungary.

The construction of these towers was also intended to counter the so-called Bismarck cult which had resulted, for example, in the erection of hundreds of Bismarck towers and columns.

Kaiser towers in Germany 
 Kaiser Tower on the Neunkircher Höhe in the Odenwald
 Kaiser Tower (Wernigerode) on the Armeleuteberg near Wernigerode
 Kaiser Tower on the Steinberg near Goslar
 Kaiser Tower in Quedlinburg, since converted into a residence
 Kaiser Tower in Hirschberg (Riesengebirge)
 Kaiser Tower near Leutenberg in Thuringia
 Kaiserwarte near Blankenburg (Harz), renamed the Wilhelm Raabe Tower

Kaiser towers in Austria-Hungary 
 Kaiser Tower on the Nollendorfer Höhe, after 1918 renamed the Karl Weis Tower (Karl-Weis-Warte), later demolished

See also
 Kaiser William Tower
 Kaiser William monument

Monuments and memorials in Germany